Robbie Ure (born 24 February 2004) is a Scottish professional footballer who plays as a forward for Scottish Premiership side Rangers.

Club career
Ure, a product of the Rangers youth academy, signed a contract extension with the club until the summer of 2023 in June 2021. He made his Rangers debut on 30 August 2022, starting in a League Cup match at home to Queen of the South and scored his first professional goal ten minutes into the game. He had to wait almost three months for his next senior appearance, as a late substitute appearance in a Scottish Premiership match away to St Mirren on 12 November 2022.

International career
He has represented Scotland, playing twice for the under-19s team.

Career statistics

References

External links

2004 births
Living people
Scottish footballers
Association football forwards
Scottish Football League players
Rangers F.C. players
Scotland youth international footballers
Lowland Football League players